Andreea Aanei (born 18 November 1993) is a Romanian weightlifter. She competed in the women's +75 kg event at the 2016 Summer Olympics.

References

External links
 

1993 births
Living people
Romanian female weightlifters
Olympic weightlifters of Romania
Weightlifters at the 2016 Summer Olympics
Weightlifters at the 2010 Summer Youth Olympics
European Weightlifting Championships medalists
Sportspeople from Botoșani
21st-century Romanian women